Sven Johan Methling (or Sven Methling Jr.) (20 September 1918 – August 7, 2005) was a Danish film director and screenwriter. The son of actor and film director Svend Methling, Methling Jr. was best known for a series of light-hearted comedies. His 1959 comedy Vi er allesammen tossede (All of us are Crazy) received the Bodil Award for Best Danish Film. Methling also received the Bodil Award for Best Danish Film for the 1955 war drama Der kom en dag (There Will Come a Day).

Career 
Sven Johan Methling was born in Copenhagen, Denmark on 20 September 1918. As the son of film director Svend Methling, Methling Jr. was born into the film industry. He started work as a sound assistant with Palladium Films from 1940 to 1945. In 1944, Methling performed the leading role in the drama Det Store Ansvar (The Great Responsibility), directed by his father. Then in 1946, he co-directed with his father an animated feature, Fyretøjet, based on the H.C. Andersen story.

Methling made his solo directorial debut in 1953 with the crime drama Kriminalsagen. His next effort, Der kom en dag (There Will Come a Day) was a war drama about the German occupation of Denmark during World War II. Based upon a novel by Flemming Muus, the film received critical praise and was awarded the Bodil Award for Best Danish Film of 1955. Over the next several years, Methling made a series of popular war comedies, the Soldaterkammerater movies (Soldier Buddies). In 1959, Methling directed the surreal comedy Vi er allesammen tossede (We are Altogether Crazy) for which he was again awarded the Bodil Award for Best Danish Film. During the 1960s, Methling began writing screenplays as well as directing, and his name became synonymous with light-hearted comedies.

In 1966, Methling became a teacher at the National Film School of Denmark and he was employed as a consultant at the Danish Film Institute from 1979 to 1981. In the 1990s Methling returned to directing with the popular comedy films, The Crumbs (Krummerne). Methling died in Copenhagen, Denmark on 7 August 2005.

Filmography (selected)

References

External links 
 
 Det Danske Filminstitut
 The Danish Film Database

1918 births
2005 deaths
Danish film directors
20th-century screenwriters
Danish male screenwriters
Film directors from Copenhagen